Kiresur is a village in Dharwad district of Karnataka, India.

Demographics 
As of the 2011 Census of India there were 871 households in Kirasur and a total population of 3,842 consisting of 1,921 males and 1,921 females. There were 475 children ages 0-6.

References

Villages in Dharwad district